Masmo is a suburban district south of Stockholm and part of Huddinge Municipality. The Masmo metro station was opened in 1972.

Stockholm urban area